The current lieutenant governor of Rhode Island is Sabina Matos, who was sworn in on April 14, 2021, after Daniel McKee succeeded to the office of governor. The first lieutenant governor was George Brown.

In Rhode Island, the lieutenant governor and governor of Rhode Island are elected on separate tickets.

Seven lieutenant governors have served during a vacancy in the office of governor under the current 1842 constitution: Francis M. Dimond (1853), William C. Cozzens (1863), Charles D. Kimball (1901), Norman Case (1928), John Pastore (1945), and John S. McKiernan (1950).

Deputy governors of the Colony of Rhode Island 

William Brenton, of Newport; November 1663 – 2 May 1666
Nicholas Easton, of Newport; 2 May 1666 – 5 May 1669
John Clarke, of Newport; 5 May 1669 – 4 May 1670
Nicholas Easton, of Newport; 4 May 1670 – 3 May 1671
John Clarke, of Newport; 3 May 1671 – 1 May 1672
John Cranston, of Newport; 1 May 1672 – 7 May 1673
William Coddington, of Newport; 7 May 1673 – 6 May 1674
John Easton, of Newport; 6 May 1674 – April 1676
John Cranston, of Newport; 3 May 1676 – 8 November 1678 (became governor)
James Barker, of Newport; 8 November 1678 – 7 May 1679
Walter Clarke, of Newport; 7 May 1679 – 5 May 1686
John Coggeshall, Jr., of Newport; 5 May 1686 – June 1686
 
The Royal Charter was suspended from 1686 until 1689.

John Coggeshall, Jr., of Newport; 18 April 1689 – 7 May 1690
John Greene, Jr., of Warwick; 7 May 1690 – May 1, 1700
Walter Clarke, of Newport; May 1, 1700 – May 23, 1714 (died in office)
Henry Tew, of Newport; June 15, 1714 – May 3, 1715
Joseph Jenckes, of Providence; May 3, 1715 – May 3, 1721
John Wanton, of Newport; May 3, 1721 – May 2, 1722
Joseph Jenckes, of Providence; May 2, 1722 – May 3, 1727
Jonathan Nichols, of Newport; May 3, 1727 – August 2, 1727 (died in office)
Thomas Frye, of East Greenwich; August 22, 1727 – May 7, 1729
John Wanton, of Newport; May 7, 1729 – May 5, 1734
George Hazard, of S. Kingstown; May 5, 1734 – before May 22, 1738 (died in office)
Daniel Abbott, of Providence; July 5, 1738 – May 1, 1740
Richard Ward, of Newport; May 1, 1740 – July 15, 1740 (became governor)
William Greene, of Newport; July 15, 1740 – May 4, 1743
Joseph Whipple, Jr., of Newport; 	May 4, 1743 – May 1, 1745
William Robinson, of S. Kingstown; May 1, 1745 – May 7, 1746
Joseph Whipple, Jr., of Newport; 	May 7, 1746 – May 6, 1747
William Robinson, of S. Kingstown; May 6, 1747 – May 4, 1748
William Ellery, Sr., of Newport; 	May 4, 1748 – May 2, 1750
Robert Hazard, of S. Kingstown; May 2, 1750 – May 1, 1751
Joseph Whipple, III, of Newport;    May 1, 1751 – November 2, 1753 (resigned)
Jonathan Nichols, Jr., of Newport; November 2, 1753 – May 1, 1754
John Gardner, of Newport; 	May 1, 1754 – May 7, 1755
Jonathan Nichols, Jr., of Newport; May 7, 1755 – September 1756 (died in office)
John Gardner, of Newport; September 6, 1756 – January 1764 (died in office)
Joseph Wanton, Jr., of Newport; February 27, 1764 – May 1, 1765
Elisha Brown, of N. Providence; May 1, 1765 – May 6, 1767
Joseph Wanton, Jr., of Newport; 	May 6, 1767 – May 4, 1768
Nicholas Cooke, of Providence;   May 4, 1768 – May 3, 1769
Darius Sessions, of Providence; 	May 3, 1769 – May 3, 1775
Nicholas Cooke, of Providence; May 3, 1775 – November 7, 1775 (became governor)
William Bradford, of Bristol; November 7, 1775 – May 6, 1778

Deputy and lieutenant governors of the State of Rhode Island 

The title of the office was changed to Lieutenant Governor in 1798.

Lieutenant governors under the constitution, 1843–present

Unusual candidacies
During the 2010 elections, the Cool Moose Party of Rhode Island submitted Bob Healey as candidate for lieutenant governor. He ran on the proposition that he would attempt to abolish the office of lieutenant governor itself.

References

Lieutenant governors of Rhode Island
 
Lieutenant governor
Rhode Island